= Reza Zafari =

American private wealth advisor

- Born: Iran
- Education: Pomona College
- Occupation: Private wealth advisor
- Title: Managing Director at Merrill

Reza Zafari (born c. 1960) is an Iranian-born American private wealth advisor. He is a managing director at Merrill.

== Early life and education ==
Zafari was born in Iran, but emigrated to the United States due to the Iranian Revolution, where he attended Pomona College and studied economics.

== Personal life ==
Zafari is a trustee of Pomona.
